Philippine Airlines Flight 475 was a scheduled passenger flight from Manila's Ninoy Aquino International Airport to Butuan's Bancasi Airport that overran the runway at Butuan airport.

Accident

At approximately 6:25 a.m. on October 26, 2007, PAL Express Flight 475 overshot the runway while landing at Butuan Airport. There were no fatalities among the aircraft's crew and passengers. The aircraft, an Airbus A320-214 with tail number RP-C3224, was destroyed during the incident and subsequently retired from service. After over running the runway, the A320 plowed into a bean field before hitting some coconut trees. Nineteen people suffered injuries; the pilot and co-pilot suffered neck and nose injuries, and several people were taken to a hospital. Most injuries were sustained during the emergency evacuation. Bancasi Airport was closed for at least 1 day as air transport authorities evaluated the facility's ability to continue handling flights. The cause of the accident is believed to be pilot error. According to eye-witness reports the airliner landed past the initial touchdown zone of the runway, which left inadequate distance for the airliner to slow down, causing the airliner to run off the runway.

References 

Accidents and incidents involving the Airbus A320
Philippine Airlines Flight 475
Aviation accidents and incidents in the Philippines
475
Airliner accidents and incidents involving runway overruns
History of Agusan del Norte
Philippine Airlines Flight 475
Philippine Airlines Flight 475